Barbara Jeanne Paul (June 5, 1931 – 2022) was an American writer of detective stories and science fiction. She was born in Maysville, Kentucky in 1931 and was educated at Bowling Green State University and the University of Pittsburgh.

A number of her novels feature in-jokes: for example Full Frontal Murder borrows various names from the British TV series Blake's 7.

Paul lived near Boston, Massachusetts. She died in 2022, at the age of 91.

Bibliography

Science fiction novels 
An Exercise for Madmen (1978)
Pillars of Salt (1978)
Bibblings (1979)
Under the Canopy (1980)
The Three-Minute Universe (1988) (a Star Trek novel)

Mystery novels 
The Fourth Wall (1979)
Liars and Tyrants and People Who Turn Blue (1980)
First Gravedigger (1980)
Your Eyelids Are Growing Heavy (1981)
The Renewable Virgin (1984)
Kill Fee (1985) (Later adapted into a 1990 TV-film Murder C.O.D..)
A Cadenza for Caruso (1984)
Prima Donna at Large (1985)
But He Was Already Dead When I Got There (1986)
A Chorus of Detectives (1987)
He Huffed and He Puffed (1989)
Good King Sauerkraut (1989)
In-laws and Outlaws (1990) (Later adapted into a 1997 TV-film Der Tusel der Furcht.)
You Have the Right To Remain Silent (1992)
The Apostrophe Thief (1993)
Fare Play (1995)
Full Frontal Murder (1997)

References

External links
 Homepage

1931 births
2022 deaths
20th-century American novelists
20th-century American women writers
21st-century American women
Novelists from Kentucky
Bowling Green State University alumni
University of Pittsburgh alumni
Women science fiction and fantasy writers
American women novelists
American science fiction writers
People from Maysville, Kentucky
American mystery writers
Women mystery writers
Kentucky women writers